Lioconcha is a genus of molluscs in the family Veneridae.

Species
 Lioconcha annettae Lamprell & Whitehead, 1990
 Lioconcha arabaya Van der Meij, Moolenbeek & Dekker, 2010
 Lioconcha berthaulti Lamprell & Healy, 2002
 Lioconcha caledonensis Harte & Lamprell, 1999
 Lioconcha castrensis (Linnaeus, 1758)
 Lioconcha fastigiata (Sowerby, 1851)
 Lioconcha gordoni (E. A. Smith, 1885)
 Lioconcha harteae M. Huber, 2010
 Lioconcha hieroglyphica (Conrad, 1837)
 Lioconcha kovalisi De Prins, 2013
 Lioconcha lamprelli Moolenbeek, Dekker & van der Meij, 2008
 Lioconcha macaulayi Lamprell & Healy, 2002
 Lioconcha melharteae Lamprell & Stanisic, 1996
 Lioconcha ornata (Dillwyn, 1817)
 Lioconcha philippinarum (Hanley, 1844)
 Lioconcha picta (Lamarck, 1818)
 Lioconcha polita (Röding, 1798)
 Lioconcha richerdeforgersi Lamprell & Stanisic, 1996
 Lioconcha rumphii Van der Meij, Moolenbeek & Dekker, 2010
 Lioconcha schiottei Lamprell & Healy, 2002
 Lioconcha sowerbyi (Deshayes, 1853)
 Lioconcha tigrina (Lamarck, 1818)
 Lioconcha trimaculata (Lamarck, 1818)

References

External links
 Mörch, O. A. L. (1852-1853). Catalogus conchyliorum quae reliquit D. Alphonso d'Aguirra & Gadea Comes de Yoldi, Regis Daniae Cubiculariorum Princeps, Ordinis Dannebrogici in Prima Classe & Ordinis Caroli Tertii Eques. Fasc. 1, Cephalophora, 170 pp. [1852; Fasc. 2, Acephala, Annulata, Cirripedia, Echinodermata, 74 [+2] pp. [1853]. Hafniae]

Veneridae
Bivalve genera